Audenshaw is an electoral ward of Tameside, England. It is represented in Westminster by Andrew Gwynne Labour MP for Denton and Reddish.

Councillors 
The ward is represented by three councillors: Oliver Ryan (Lab), Maria Bailey (Lab), and Teresa Smith (Lab).

 indicates seat up for re-election.

Elections in 2010s

May 2018

May 2016

May 2015

May 2014

May 2012

May 2011

May 2010

Elections in 2000s

May 2008

May 2007

May 2006

June 2004

References 

Wards of Tameside
Audenshaw